Escadrille Spa.75 (originally Escadrille N.75) was a French fighter squadron active during World War I. Beginning 12 April 1917, they became part of Groupe de Combat 14, and fought as such until the 11 November 1918 ceasefire. The escadrille was Mentioned in dispatches for having shot down 29 German airplanes and two observation balloons.

History
Escadrille Spa.75 was founded as Escadrille N.75 on 13 July 1916; its initial designation stemmed from it being fitted with Nieuport XIII airplanes. It supported the VIII Armee until 12 April 1917, at which time it refitted with SPAD S.7s, was renamed Escadrille Spa.75, and was amalgamated into Groupe de Combat 14. The squadron would fight as part of the Groupe for the rest of World War I.

Groupe de Combat 14 would support several different French field armies in several different locations, including Flanders from 4 May to 1 June 1918.

Postwar, on 23 December 1918, the squadron was Mentioned in dispatches for having destroyed 29 German airplanes and two observation balloons.

Commanding officers
 Capitaine Henri de Montfort: 16 July 1916 - 22 December 1917
 Lieutenant Pierre Blandinieres: 22 December 1917 - 11 November 1918

Notable members
 Sous lieutenant William Herisson
 Adjutant Antoine Laplasse

Aircraft
 Nieuport XIII: 16 July 1916
 SPAD S.7: from 12 April 1917

End notes

Reference
 Franks, Norman; Bailey, Frank (1993). Over the Front: The Complete Record of the Fighter Aces and Units of the United States and French Air Services, 1914–1918 London, UK: Grub Street Publishing. .

Fighter squadrons of the French Air and Space Force
Military units and formations established in 1916
Military units and formations disestablished in 1918
Military units and formations of France in World War I
Military aviation units and formations in World War I